R554 road may refer to:
 R554 road (Ireland)
 R554 road (South Africa)